The Monk Who Sold His Ferrari is a self-help book by Robin Sharma, a writer and motivational speaker. The book is a business fable derived from Sharma's personal experiences after leaving his career as a litigation lawyer at the age of 25.

Publication
The Monk Who Sold His Ferrari was published in 1999 by Harper Collins Publishers, and has sold more than three million copies as of 2013.

Synopsis
The book develops around two characters, Julian Mantle and his best friend John, in the form of conversation. Julian narrates his spiritual experiences during a Himalayan journey which he undertook after selling his holiday home and red Ferrari.

References

1999 fiction books
Self-help books
1999 Canadian novels
Harper San Francisco books